The Memorial Museum Passchendaele 1917 in Zonnebeke is a Belgian museum devoted to the 1917 Battle of Passchendaele (also known as the Third Battle of Ypres). In this battle, in only 100 days, almost 500,000 men were killed to gain only eight kilometres of ground. The museum is housed in the historic château grounds of Zonnebeke and focuses on the material aspects of the First World War.

History 
The history of the Memorial Museum Passchendaele (MMP1917) started in 1987. It featured the first exhibition about the Third Battle in Ypres (1917). This exhibition consisted of previously unseen visual materials from the Imperial War Museum. This initial exhibition was considered successful, with 9,000 visitors, who attended, amongst other events, a large ceremony at Tyne Cot Cemetery and battlefield tours.

Because of this success, it was decided to put the château at the museum's disposal, with attention fixed on the war years, but also the Zonnebeke Augustinian Abbey and local history. The museum itself opened in 1989.

In 2002, it was decided to renew the museum. The museum was increased to three storeys and became a classic historical museum with a reconstructed dug-out being built. The renewed museum opened on Anzac Day 2004.

In 2007, during the commemoration of 90 years since the 'Third Battle of Ypres', the museum organised six thematic exhibitions who took place in different locations, along with creating three new trails.

In 2013, the restoration of the former vicarage was completed to be used as 'Kenniscentrum'.

Theme: The Third Battle of Ypres 
The main theme of the museum is the Third Battle of Ypres, also known as the Battle of Passchendaele. This was a major battle in 1917 during the First World War which was fought by British, Anzac and Canadian troops and the German army. The total loss of human lives is about 450,000, for only 8 km gain of ground. With this battle the main goal was reached to eliminate an important part of the German Army.

Location 
The historic château of Zonnebeke is the ideal departure area for an expedition around the battlefields of 1917. It is within less than 3 km from Polygon Wood and Tyne Cot Cemetery, the largest cemetery of the Commonwealth War Graves Commission.

Next to the reception desk of the museum you can find the visitors' lounge with information on Zonnebeke.

The track 
The track of the museum is about 600 metres and is situated in the château grounds of Zonnebeke. There are five categories, every part of the museum treats a different category. Everything is stored in the museum and there is also a garden in open air. In this museum there is an imitation of a dugout and the trenches are also part of the museum.

The collection 
The collection from the MMP1917 is rather dynamic. The head collection consists of militaria and many personal objects and documents.

- The old collection (obtained between 1989 and 2002)
- The Hill 60 collection
- The Vieux-Berquin collection
- The Fierens collection
- The personal collection

Knowledge centre 
In April 2014 the new knowledge centre Passchendaele opened. In the former vicarage of Zonnebeke there are documentary collections of the MMP1917 and the Zonnebeekse Heemvrienden. Next to the maintenance and the supervision of the documentary collection there is also scientific research done. Downstairs in the building is a reading room, for about 20 researchers.

Projects and events 
The museum has an extensive calendar full of events and activities linked to the First World War in the neighbourhood.

References

External links 
 Official Website

World War I museums in Belgium
Museums in West Flanders
Zonnebeke